The  is an opera house in Florence, Italy. It was originally built as the open-air amphitheatre, the Politeama Fiorentino Vittorio Emanuele, which was inaugurated on 17 May 1862 with a production of 
Donizetti's Lucia di Lammermoor and which seated 6,000 people. It became the focus on cultural life in the city. After closure caused by fire, it reopened in April 1864 and acquired a roof in 1882. By 1911 it had both electricity and heating.

In 1930 the building was taken over by the city authorities who renamed it the Teatro Comunale.  Bombing during the Second World War damaged the building once again, and other problems closed it for three years in 1958.  Finally, in May 1961, the then-modernized theatre reopened with Verdi's Don Carlo. It had become a 2,000 seat elliptically shaped auditorium consisting of a large orchestra section, one tier of boxes, and two wide semicircular galleries, which betray the building's amphitheatre origins.

See also
List of opera houses

References
Lynn, Karyl Charna, Italian Opera Houses and Festivals, Lanham, Maryland: The Scarecrow Press, Inc., 2005.  
 Plantamura, Carol, The Opera Lover's Guide to Europe, New York: Citadel Press, 1996.

External links
 Teatro official website

Comunale Florence
Music venues completed in 1862
Theatres in Florence
Event venues established in 1862
Theatres completed in 1862
1862 establishments in Italy
Opera in Florence
19th-century architecture in Italy